The 1914–15 season was the 44th season of competitive football in England.

Overview

The 1914 Charity Shield was not contested due to suspension of football during World War I.

Events
Suspicious patterns of betting on the game between Liverpool and Manchester United led to allegations of match fixing and the 1915 British football betting scandal. Eventually seven players (three from United, four from Liverpool) were banned from football.
Tom Watson, Liverpool's manager for the last 19 years, died on 6 May 1915.

Honours

Notes = Number in parentheses is the times that club has won that honour. * indicates new record for competition

League tables

Football League First Division

Football League Second Division

Southern League Division 1

See also
England national football team results (unofficial matches)

References

 
Wartime seasons in English football